The 17th Irish Film & Television Academy Awards took place in July 2021. The ceremony honoured Irish films and television drama released between 1 February 2020 and 31 May 2021.

The nominees were announced on 15 June 2021. Normal People received an unprecedented fifteen nominations. At the ceremony in July 2021, Normal People won nine prizes.

Film

Best film

 Broken Law
 Dating Amber
 Herself
 Vivarium
Wildfire
Wolfwalkers (winner)

Director
Cathy Brady – Wildfire (winner)                    
David Freyne – Dating Amber                     
Lorcan Finnegan – Vivarium          
Paddy Slattery – Broken Law                      
Tomm Moore and Ross Stewart – Wolfwalkers

Script 
Cathy Brady – Wildfire                      
Clare Dunne and Malcolm Campbell – Herself (winner)
 David Freyne – Dating Amber                     
Paddy Slattery – Broken Law                      
Will Collins – Wolfwalkers

Actress in a leading role

 Jessie Buckley – I'm Thinking of Ending Things 
 Clare Dunne – Herself
 Lola Petticrew – Dating Amber
Nika McGuigan – Wildfire (posthumous) (winner)
Nora-Jane Noone – Wildfire

Actor in a leading role

 Ciarán Hinds – The Man In The Hat
Fionn O'Shea – Dating Amber
Gabriel Byrne – Death of a Ladies' Man (winner)
Moe Dunford – Knuckledust
Tristan Heanue – Broken Law

Actress in a supporting role

 Ally Ní Charáin – Broken Law
 Kathy Kiera Clarke – A Bend in the River  
 Molly McCann – Herself
Saoirse Ronan – Ammonite
Sharon Horgan – Dating Amber (winner)

Actor in a supporting role

 Barry Ward – Dating Amber (winner)
Brian Gleeson – Death of a Ladies' Man
 Colm Meaney – Pixie
 Conleth Hill – Herself
 Ned Dennehy – Undergods

George Morrison Feature Documentary

 Breaking Out (winner)            
 Finding Jack Charlton                      
 Henry Glassie: Field Work               
 Phil Lynott: Songs for While I'm Away    
 The 8th
 Tomorrow is Saturday

Short film – Live action

 Five Letters to the Stranger Who Will Dissect My Brain             
 Flicker            
 Kathleen Was Here               
 My Other Suit Is Human                   
 Rough (winner)             
 The Invisible Boy

Animated short 

 Gunter Falls in Love             
 Her Song (winner)                   
 The Dead Hands of Dublin              
 The Voyage               
 Zog and the Flying Doctors

Rising Star Award
 Nicola Coughlan (winner)
Eve Hewson – Behind Her Eyes

Television drama

Drama

 Blood, series 2 (Channel 5 / Virgin Media One) 
 Line of Duty, series 6 (BBC One)
 Normal People (RTÉ One / BBC Three) (winner) Dead Still (Acorn TV)
Smother (RTÉ One)
 Vikings, series 6 (History [Canada])

Director
 Dearbhla Walsh – Fargo 
Dathaí Keane – Smother
Imogen Murphy – Dead StillLenny Abrahamson – Normal People (winner)
Steve St. Leger – Vikings

Script
Adam Patterson and Declan Lawn – The Salisbury Poisonings
Kate O'Riordan – Smother
Lisa McGee – The Deceived
John Morton – Dead Still
Sally Rooney – Normal People (winner)

Actress in a leading role

 Niamh Algar – Raised by Wolves 
Aisling Franciosi – Black Narcissus
Dervla Kirwan – Smother (winner)
Eve Hewson – Behind Her Eyes
Catherine Walker – The Deceived

Actor in a leading role

 Adrian Dunbar – Line of Duty
 James Nesbitt – Bloodlands
 Brendan Gleeson – The Comey Rule
Michael Smiley – Dead Still
Paul Mescal – Normal People (winner)

Actress in a supporting role

 Fiona Shaw – Killing Eve
 Gemma-Leah Devereux – Smother
 Nicola Coughlan – Bridgerton
 Sarah Greene – Normal People (winner)
 Seána Kerslake – Smother

Actor in a supporting role
Andrew Scott – His Dark Materials
Colm Meaney – Gangs of London
 Desmond Eastwood – Normal People
 Éanna Hardwicke – Smother
 Fionn O'Shea – Normal People (winner)

Craft

Score

 Aza Hand – Son (winner)
 Colm Mac Con Iomaire – A Bend in the River
 John McPhillips – Smother
Stephen Rennicks – Normal People 
Ray Harman – Blood

Editing

 Colin Campbell – Here are the Young Men
Gráinne Gavigan – Dead Still
 Nathan Nugent – Normal People
Tony Cranstoun – Vivarium
Úna Ní Dhonghaíle – Misbehaviour (winner)

Production Design

 John Leslie – Son
 Lucy van Lonkhuyzen – Normal People (winner)
 Philip Murphy – Vivarium
 Ray Ball – Sea Fever
 Tamara Conboy – Herself

Cinematography

Cathal Watters – Smother
 Ciaran Tanham – Dead Still
 James Mather – Here are the Young Men
Kate McCullough – Normal People (winner) 
Suzie Lavelle – Normal People

Costume

 Aisling Wallace Byrne – Here are the Young Men 
 Joan O'Clery – Dating Amber
 Leonie Prendergast – Gretel & Hansel (winner)
 Lorna Marie Mugan – Normal People
 Triona Lillis – Smother

Makeup & Hair

Jennie Readman and Niamh O'Loan – Vivarium
 Linda Gannon Foster and Jennifer Hegarty – Dead Still
Linda Gannon Foster and Liz Byrne – Gretel & Hansel (winner)
Sandra Kelly and Sharon Doyle – Normal People
Siobhan Harper-Ryan – I Hate Suzie

Sound Design

 Aza Hand and Patrick Drummond – Son
 Hugh Fox, Fionán Higgins & Mark Henry – Smother
 Kieran Horgan & Brendan Rehill – Phil Lynott: Songs for While I'm Away
 Patrick Drummond, Aza Hand, Katie O'Mahony & Adrian Conway – Here are the Young Men
 Steve Fanagan, Niall Brady & Niall O Sullivan – Normal People (winner)

VFX

 Jim O’Hagan and Ed Bruce – WandaVision
 Ed Bruce – Shadow and Bone
 Ed Bruce – Kidding (winner)

References

External links
 Awards at the Irish Film and Television Academy official website

2021 in Irish television
17
2020 film awards
2021 television awards
2021 film awards